The Kara Musa Pasha Mosque is a historical Ottoman mosque in the town of Rethymno, on the island of Crete, Greece.

History 
Located on Arkadiou street, it was most likely erected during the 1680s, or right after the conquest of the city in 1646, perhaps by the Ottoman governor of Crete, on the site of a Venetian monastery dedicated to Saint Barbara. Another date of erection suggested is 1683. Today it is preserved in its entirety in good condition, save for its minaret, of which only the base survives. It has been restored by the Greek Archaeological Service, and is being considered to be made into a museum about the Ottoman architecture of Crete.

Architecture 
After the monastery's conversion into mosque in the seventeenth century, a dome and a minaret was added to it by the Ottoman Turks.

In the area there is also a fountain topped with a dome, which has two sides: one side facing Arkadiou Street, and the other the courtyard of the mosque. Under its dome is the entrance to the mosque. A turbes (a type of vaulted funerary structure) is preserved in the precinct, in which the founder of the mosque, Kara Musa Pasha, was probably buried.

Gallery

See also 

 Ottoman Crete
 List of mosques in Greece
 List of former mosques in Greece
 Islam in Greece

References

External links 
 

Rethymno
Ottoman mosques in Greece
Buildings and structures in Crete
Former mosques in Greece
Ottoman architecture in Crete
17th-century architecture in Greece
17th-century mosques
Mosque buildings with domes
Mosques converted from churches in Ottoman Greece
Religious buildings and structures in Crete